Betchadupa was a New Zealand pop/rock group, formed in Auckland, New Zealand, in 1997. The band featured Liam Finn, Chris Garland, Joe Bramley, and Matt Eccles.

Betchadupa (originally called Lazy Boy – the name change followed threatened legal action from the chair company of the same name) had its origins when Liam and Matt met whilst their families were on holidays in New Zealand. Their first song, written when both boys were 11, was called 'Gee This Sounds Good, I Can't Believe We Wrote It'. Their unique name was lifted from the text of a Polish-American's T-shirt that declared "You Betchadupa I'm Polish", dupa being the casual Polish word for arse.

The band based themselves in London, UK, after spending much of 2004 in Melbourne, Australia.  The band have been on hiatus while Liam has undertaken a solo career.  It is uncertain if the band will ever reform.

Betchadupa has had extensive experience playing with such bands as Queens of the Stone Age, Foo Fighters, Jane's Addiction and ended the year 2001 on a high playing alongside Pearl Jam's Eddie Vedder at the Neil Finn and Friends concert 7 Worlds Collide in Auckland, and being named Top New Act at the prestigious NZ Music Awards as well as becoming the toast of the South By Southwest Music Convention in Austin, Texas, in January 2003.

Band members
Liam Finn – vocals, guitar
Chris Garland – guitar
Joe Bramley – bass, backing vocals
Matt Eccles – drums

Discography

Albums

EPs

Singles

Awards

|-
| 2001
| Betchadupa
| Best New Act – New Zealand Music Awards
|  
|-
| 2002
| The Alphabetchadupa
| Best Pop/Rock Release – BNet NZ Music Awards
|  
|}

References

External links
AudioCulture profile
Official site (defunct)
Official Fan Forum (defunct)
myspace.com Profile

New Zealand pop rock groups
Musical groups established in 1997
Flying Nun Records artists